Revenge of the Conquered (literally "Drakut the Avenger") is a 1961 Italian epic adventure film  directed  by Luigi Capuano and starring Burt Nelson and Wandisa Guida. It grossed 244 million lire at the Italian box office.

Plot
This action packed romantic thriller begins as Drakut encounters and saves a pretty young gypsy on his return home from war. Drakut is not aware that the gypsy girl is actually Princess Irina, and she is not aware that Drakut is the son of the gypsy queen. Princess Irina's father, Nicholas, is the fair ruler of the local kingdom, however, is often influenced by the evil Grand Duke, Atanas. Chaos ensues when Atanas has Drakut's mother burned at the stake after speculation that she is a witch. None-the-wiser to Atanas' evil motives Drakut blames Irina for his mother's death. Atanas then has Nicholas killed and blames it on Drakut. When Drakut eventually learns the true identity of the gypsy girl as Princess Irina, he rescues her from an arranged marriage to Atanas. In return, the Princess names Drakut a Prince, making him eligible to marry her.

Cast 

Burt Nelson as Drakut
 Wandisa Guida as  Irina
 Mario Petri as  Atanas
 Moira Orfei as  Edmea
 Walter Barnes  
 Franco Fantasia  
 Carla Calò  
 Maria Grazia Spina 
 Rosalia Maggio 
 Ugo Sasso 
 Elio Crovetto

References

External links

 
1961 adventure films
Italian adventure films 
Films directed by Luigi Capuano
Fictional representations of Romani people
1960s Italian-language films
1960s Italian films